Coxina is a genus of moths in the family Erebidae.

Species
 Coxina cinctipalpis J.B. Smith, 1899
 Coxina cymograpta Dognin, 1914
 Coxina ensipalpis Guenee, 1852
 Coxina guinocha Schaus, 1933
 Coxina hadenoides Guenée, 1852
 Coxina plumbeola Hampson, 1926
 Coxina thermeola Hampson, 1926
 Coxina turibia Schaus, 1934

References

 Coxina at Markku Savela's Lepidoptera and Some Other Life Forms
 Natural History Museum Lepidoptera genus database

Omopterini
Moth genera